St. Britto Higher Secondary School is a Catholic higher secondary school in Arapalayam, Madurai. The school was established in 1968 and has more than 2000 students and 50 teaching staffs. It is run by Roman Catholic Diocese of Madurai  and managed by Bishop of Madurai . For the firsttime a lay man Mr. A. Yagappan headed the school and brought glory. The school has both English and Tamil medium classes from 6th to 12th. .

References
http://www.stbrittoschool.org/

External links

Catholic secondary schools in India
Boys' schools in India
Christian schools in Tamil Nadu
High schools and secondary schools in Tamil Nadu
Schools in Madurai